Oenomaus gaia is a species of butterfly of the family Lycaenidae. It is found in wet and dry lowland forests in Panama, French Guiana, Venezuela, eastern Ecuador, Peru and Brazil.

References

Butterflies described in 2008
Eumaeini
Lycaenidae of South America